Nowe Piekuty  is a village in Wysokie Mazowieckie County, Podlaskie Voivodeship, in north-eastern Poland. It is the seat of the gmina (administrative district) called Gmina Nowe Piekuty.

The village has a population of 2,100.

References

Nowe Piekuty
Łomża Governorate
Białystok Voivodeship (1919–1939)
Belastok Region